Trigena terranea is a moth in the family Cossidae. It was described by Ureta in 1957. It is found in Chile.

References

Natural History Museum Lepidoptera generic names catalog

Cossinae
Moths described in 1957
Endemic fauna of Chile